Ignacio Rodríguez (born 1999 in Montevideo) is an Uruguayan programmer, two-time winner of worldwide programming competition Google Code-in (in 2013 and in 2014) and a member of the Sugar Labs educational open-source organization. Rodríguez lives in Canelones.

References 

1999 births
Living people
One Laptop per Child
Free software programmers